Jemma L Wadham is a British glacial biogeochemist.

Early life and education 
Wadham completed her BA and MA in physical geography at Cambridge University. She then completed her PhD at the University of Bristol in 1998.

Career 
Wadham undertook a short post-doctoral research post at the University of Leeds before returning to the University of Bristol to take up a post at the Bristol Glaciology Centre.

Wadham researches glacial ecosystems and investigates their impact on biogeochemical processes. She has worked in the polar regions, including the Antarctic and the Greenland ice sheets. This has led to more than 90 articles and a textbook on Antarctic lakes.

In 2022 Wadham and her collaborator Dr Monica Winsborrow were awarded €15 million to direct the Centre for ice, Cryosphere, Carbon and Climate (iC3), a ten-year Norwegian Centre of Research Excellence funded by the Norwegain Research Council that will run from 2023-2033. iC3 will be located at the University of Tromsø.

Wadham has been involved with the International Scientific Committee on Antarctic Research, the Scientific Committee on Antarctic Research (SCAR) and subglacial science in Antarctica. She has served on the Lake Ellsworth Exploration Steering Committee and is a contributor to this subglacial lake exploration programme. 

In 2012, Wadham's team at the University of Bristol used computer models to predict the amount of trapped methane under ice sheets and discovered 400 billion metric tons of carbon beneath.

She is one of few women working on technology development for exploring subglacial lakes. Her work in Greenland has advanced our understanding of the dynamics of ice sheets and their contribution to global biogeochemical cycles.

Awards and honours 
She was awarded a Philip Leverhulme Prize in October 2007 for her international contribution to polar science.

References 

British Antarctic scientists
Women Antarctic scientists
British glaciologists
Women glaciologists
British women scientists
British geochemists
Women geochemists
Biogeochemists
Year of birth missing (living people)
Living people
Alumni of the University of Cambridge
Alumni of the University of Bristol